Camphor Press is a British-Taiwanese independent publisher primarily focusing on books about East Asia. The company started as a digital-only publisher focused on providing a platform for English-language writing about Taiwan, before moving into print books in 2015. In 2017 Camphor Press acquired the backlist of US press EastBridge, reissuing those books under the Eastbridge Books imprint. Camphor Press has also acquired the rights to a number of out-of-print titles about Taiwan and the wider region.

Imprints
 Camphor Press: East Asia-related fiction and non-fiction for the general reader
 Eastbridge Books: East Asia-related academic books and literary translations

Notable publications

References

Book publishing companies of the United Kingdom